The Hordaland Formation is a geologic formation in Norway. It preserves fossils dating back to the Paleogene period.

See also

 List of fossiliferous stratigraphic units in Norway

References
 

Paleogene Norway